John Fasana is a former mayor of Duarte, California, and former member of the Los Angeles County Metropolitan Transportation Authority Board of Directors (1993-2020).

Fasana was first elected to the Duarte City Council in 1987, and was re-elected in 1991, 1995, 1999, 2003, 2007, and 2011. He has also served as mayor in 1990, 1997, 2003, and 2009.  A graduate of Whittier College, John has many accomplishments, such as being the chairman of the San Gabriel Valley Council of Governments Transportation Committee, representing 30 San Gabriel Valley cities as a director to the Los Angeles County Metropolitan Transportation Authority, served as chairman of the MTA board in 2001-2002, being currently a member of the Finance Committee and the Operations Committee, and represented the League of California Cities in the development of ballot language and support by cities of the 1992 Los Angeles County Park and Recreation Act, which passed with over 60% of the vote and included funding for the Duarte Teen Center.

Fasana is married to his wife Kris and they have lived in Duarte since 1985. They have three children together, all of whom graduated from Duarte High School.

References

External links
Official Duarte website profile
John Fasana's Website

Living people
Mayors of places in California
People from Duarte, California
Whittier College alumni
Year of birth missing (living people)
20th-century American politicians
21st-century American politicians